SKP may refer to:

Organisations
 Communist Party of Finland (Suomen Kommunistinen Puolue)
 Communist Party of Finland (1994) (Suomen Kommunistinen Puolue)
 Communist Party of Georgia (Sakartvelos Komunisturi Partia)
 Communist Party of Sweden (disambiguation) (Sveriges Kommunistiska Parti), several parties at different times

Science and technology
 Scanning Kelvin probe, a microscopy technique
 SketchUp program file format

Other uses
 Skopje International Airport (IATA code: SKP), North Macedonia
 SKP Degree College, Guntakal, Andhra Pradesh, India

See also